Kasugai may refer to:
 Kasugai, Aichi, a city in Japan
 Kasugai, Yamanashi, a town in Japan
 Kasugai (snack company), a Japanese snack company
 Kasugai Station (disambiguation)
 Nishikasugai